Shortly before midnight on Saturday, 31 December 2016, at 23:50 BRST (01:50 GMT on Sunday, 1 January 2017), a man named Sidnei Araujo entered a home where a New Year's party was taking place and opened fire at the gathering with a 9mm semi-automatic handgun. Araujo killed 12 people, including his estranged wife and his eight-year-old son, and wounded three others before committing suicide by shooting himself. Although the crime is under investigation, the motive is believed to be anger over separation with his wife. A recording of Araujo was later found in his car in which he apologizes for something that would happen, without indicating specifically what it would be.

See also
List of massacres in Brazil

References

Deaths by firearm in Brazil
Mass murder in 2016
Mass shootings in Brazil
Massacres in Brazil
Familicides
Suicides by firearm in Brazil
Murder–suicides in South America
21st century in São Paulo
December 2016 events in South America
December 2016 crimes in South America
2016 murders in Brazil
2016 mass shootings in South America
Attacks during the New Year celebrations